Lifespan is the debut album by Canadian jazz pianist Kris Davis, which was recorded in 2003 and released on the Spanish Fresh Sound New Talent label.

Reception

The All About Jazz review by John Kelman states "Davis has a writing style that has already, at this early stage, developed into a unique sound. Her material would fit comfortably within an ECM context; while there is intensity to be found, the overall approach is more inward-looking."

Reviewing for The Village Voice in September 2004, Tom Hull said of the album, "Piano trio plus three horns do her bidding without clutter or show."

Track listing
All compositions by Kris Davis
 "Jo-ann" – 9:16
 "Argyha" – 7:57
 "Travel Far" – 11:00
 "Lifespan" – 4:29
 "Even Eivind" – 10:32
 "Nein" – 1:55
 "Endless" – 8:15
 "The Epic" – 12:18

Personnel
Tony Malaby – tenor sax, soprano sax
Russ Johnson – flugelhorn, trumpet
Jason Rigby – tenor sax, soprano sax, bass clarinet, clarinet
Kris Davis – piano
Eivind Opsvik – bass
Jeff Davis – drums

References

2004 albums
Kris Davis albums
Fresh Sound albums